Start One Sensation is a debut EP by Indonesian K-pop girlgroup S.O.S, released exclusively to iTunes on February 11, 2013.

Track listing

Personnel
Maria Olivia Budiman - Vocals
Sannia Arumasari - Vocals
Jodis Rezky Anggreny Sarira Mangiwa - Vocals
Andi Adisty Wahyuni - Vocals
Yedi Yelia Dongoran - Vocals
Veronica Febrianty - Vocals (Lead)

Release history

References

2013 EPs
Sony Music EPs